Het proces Begeer  is a 1918 Dutch silent drama film directed by Theo Frenkel and based on a true story.
It follows three criminals who prepare a robbery on the diamond company of the firm Begeer in Amsterdam.
It is believed to be a lost film.

Cast
 Jacques Sluyters - Jan Bolkestein
 Coen Hissink - Willem Veltman
 Johannes Langenaken - Henri Klopper
 Chris de la Mar - Jan Hulsman
 Willy Bruns - Marie Bruns
 Annie Wesling - Toos
 Anna Langenaken-Kemper - Jans moeder
 Hendrik Kammemeijer
 Eberhard Erfmann
 Johan Valk
 Sylvain Poons - Volkstype met pet in een danshuis
 Piet Köhler
 Frits Engels
 Willem Kremer
 Willem van der Hout

References

External links 
 

1918 films
Dutch silent feature films
Dutch black-and-white films
1918 drama films
Films directed by Theo Frenkel
Dutch drama films
Silent drama films